Thierno Mamadou Lamarana Ballo (born 2 January 2002) is a professional footballer who plays as a midfielder for Austrian Bundesliga club Wolfsberger AC. Born in the Ivory Coast, he is a youth international for Austria.

Career

Chelsea
Born in Ivory Coast, Ballo moved to Guinea at the age of three before leaving for Austria four years later. Ballo joined Chelsea in January 2018, following stints with SV Chemie Linz, LASK, Bayer 04 Leverkusen and eventually, Viktoria Köln. During his debut under-18 campaign with the Blues, Ballo finished as top goalscorer for that respective age group and subsequently made his quick progression into the under-23 side over the next two years.

On 31 August 2021, Ballo returned to Austria to join Rapid Wien on loan for the 2021–22 campaign. Just under a month later, he made his debut for the club featuring as second-half substitute during their Austrian Cup 2–1 victory over Admira Wacker. After only featuring thirteen times in all competitions come January 2022, Ballo's loan was terminated and the forward subsequently returned to Chelsea.

Wolfsberger 
On 12 July 2022, Wolfsberger AC announced the signing of Ballo on a free transfer, after his release from Chelsea. Ballo signed a two year contract with an option for a further year.

Career statistics

References

2002 births
Footballers from Abidjan
Ivorian emigrants to Austria
Living people
Austrian footballers
Austria youth international footballers
Ivorian footballers
Association football midfielders
LASK players
Bayer 04 Leverkusen players
FC Viktoria Köln players
Chelsea F.C. players
SK Rapid Wien players
Wolfsberger AC players
Austrian Football Bundesliga players
Austrian expatriate footballers
Ivorian expatriate footballers
Austrian expatriate sportspeople in England
Expatriate footballers in England